Torfnesvöllur, known as Olísvöllurinn  for sponsorship reasons, is a football stadium in Ísafjörður, Iceland and the home of Vestri and Knattspyrnufélagið Hörður. It broke ground in 1963 and was opened on 18 July 1964.

References

External links
Football Association of Iceland: Picture

Football venues in Iceland
Buildings and structures in Westfjords